Achalinus jinggangensis, commonly known as Zong's odd-scaled snake, is a species of snake in the family Xenodermatidae. The species is endemic to the Jinggang Mountains in Jiangxi Province,  China.

Habitat
The maximum extent of its estimated potential range is 78 square kilometres.

Description
It is shiny blue-black both dorsally and ventrally.

Reproduction
A. jinggangensis is oviparous.

References

Further reading
Ota H, Toyama M (1989). "Taxonomic Re-definition of Achalinus formosanus Boulenger (Xenoderminae: Colubridae: Ophidia), with Description of a New Subspecies". Copeia 1989 (3): 597–602. (Achalinus jinggangensis, new combination).

Xenodermidae
Snakes of China
Endemic fauna of China
Critically endangered fauna of Asia
Reptiles described in 1983